Adédèjì is both a surname and a given name  of Yoruba origin, meaning "the crown or royalty has become twice". Notable people with the name include:

 Adebayo Adedeji (born 1930), Nigerian politician
 Yinka Adedeji (born 1985), Nigerian footballer
 Adedeji Oshilaja (born 1993), English footballer

References 

Given names of Nigerian origin
Yoruba given names
Yoruba-language surnames
Surnames of Nigerian origin